En Route is a novel by the French writer Joris-Karl Huysmans and was first published in 1895. It is the second of Huysmans's books to feature the character Durtal, a thinly disguised portrait of the author himself. Durtal had already appeared in Là-bas, investigating Satanism. En Route and the two subsequent two novels, The Cathedral and The Oblate, trace his conversion to Catholicism, an experience which reflects the author's own. As Huysmans explained:
"The plot of the novel is as simple as it could be. I've taken the principal character of Là-Bas, Durtal, had him converted and sent him to a Trappist monastery. In studying his conversion, I've tried to trace the progress of a soul surprised by the gift of grace, and developing in an ecclesiastical atmosphere, to the accompaniment of mystical literature, liturgy, and plainchant, against a background of all that admirable art which the Church has created."

References

Further reading
 Holland, B. (1901). "Rome and the Novelists," The Edinburgh Review, Vol. CXCIV, pp. 276–301.
 Paul, C. Kegan (1918). "Translator's Note." In: En Route. London: Kegan Paul, Trench, Trubner & Co., pp. v–xi.
 Ziegler, Robert (1986). "Silencing the Double: the Search for God in Huysmans' En Route," Rocky Mountain Review of Language and Literature, Vol. 40, No. 4, pp. 203–212.

External links
 Full French text
 English translation by C. Kegan Paul, at Internet Archive
 

1895 French novels
Novels by Joris-Karl Huysmans